Beaverdam Creek is a  long 2nd order tributary to the Trent River in Jones County, North Carolina.

Course
Beaverdam Creek rises about 2 miles northwest of Simmons Corner, North Carolina in Craven County and then flows south into Jones County to join the Trent River about 2 miles northwest of Oak Grove.

Watershed
Beaverdam Creek drains  of area, receives about 53.3 in/year of precipitation, has a wetness index of 602.73, and is about 33% forested.

See also
List of rivers of North Carolina

References

Rivers of North Carolina
Rivers of Jones County, North Carolina